The Richard Dawkins Award is an annual prize awarded by the Center for Inquiry (CFI). It was established in 2003 and was initially awarded by the Atheist Alliance of America coordinating with Richard Dawkins and the Richard Dawkins Foundation for Reason and Science. In 2019, the award was formally moved to CFI.  CFI is a US nonprofit organization that variously claims on its website to promote reason, science, freedom of inquiry, and humanist values, or science, reason, and secular values. The award was initially presented by the Atheist Alliance of America to honor an "outstanding atheist", who taught or advocated scientific knowledge and acceptance of nontheism, and raised public awareness. The award is currently presented by the Center for Inquiry to an individual associated with science, scholarship, education, or entertainment, and who "publicly proclaims the values of secularism and rationalism, upholding scientific truth wherever it may lead." They state that the recipient must be approved by Dawkins himself.

The Richard Dawkins Award is named in honor of the eponymous British evolutionary biologist. In a 2013 poll conducted by Prospect magazine, Dawkins was ranked first in the list of "world thinkers" rankings. He is famous for his atheistic beliefs, and has written books including The God Delusion and Outgrowing God: A Beginner's Guide. The first Richard Dawkins Award was received by James Randi, a magician who investigated and debunked various paranormal claims. In 2005, Penn Jillette and Teller, jointly as Penn & Teller, received the award. In 2009, Bill Maher received the award; due to his views on vaccines and his criticism of evidence-based medicine, oncologist David Gorski referred to him receiving the award as "inappropriate". In 2020, Javed Akhtar became the first Indian to receive the award. In 2021, Tim Minchin received the award. In 2022, Neil deGrasse Tyson received the award saying it was an honor that he would hold above all others.

List of recipients

See also 
 List of religion-related awards

Notes

References

External links 
 

Awards for contributions to culture
Atheism
Richard Dawkins
Religion-related awards
International awards
Science and technology awards
Humanities awards
Atheism activism
Criticism of religion
Disengagement from religion
Nontheism
Secularism
Separation of church and state